Nostoceras is an extinct genus of ammonites. The etymology of the name Nostoceras comes from "nostos" meaning return and "ceros" meaning horn, named as such by Alpheus Hyatt because it bends back on itself.

Taxonomy
Nostoceras is the type genus for the ammonite family Nostoceratidae which is included in the Turrilitoidea. The Turrilitoidea, with Nostoceras and the Nostoceratidae, are commonly included in the suborder Ancyloceratina but may instead belong in the Turrilitina, a proposed order of heteromorphs thought to have a separate derivation, though this separation does not have wide support.

Fossil record
Fossils of Nostoceras are found in marine strata from the Campanian stage of the Upper Cretaceous, in  the USA, England, central Europe, west Africa, Australia and Madagascar (Angola, Australia, Austria, Belgium, Denmark, England, France, Germany, Iraq, Italy, Madagascar, the Netherlands, Nigeria, Oman, Spain, United States).

Description
Nostoceras is typified by a tightly coiled helical spire on a large U shaped body chamber with the aperture, in mature individuals, nearly touching and lying underneath the spire. The initial helical whorls are covered with fine ribs and may have small spines.  The U shaped body chamber has coarser ribbing and large tubercles.  Periodic constrictions may be present on the phragmocone.  Species may coil either to the left or to the right.  Nostoceras is like Bostrychoceras in general form, except that its ribs may be flaired and the constrictions may or may not be present.

File:

Sources
Notes

Bibliography
 Arkell et al., 1957. Mesozoic Ammonoidea, Treatise on Invertebrate Paleontology, Part L. Geol Soc. of Amer. and Univ. Kans. press. 
 Larson, Neal L. 2012. The Late Campanian (Upper Cretaceous) Cephalopod Fauna of the Coon Creek Formation at the Type Locality. The Journal of Paleontological Sciences: JPS.H.2012.01. 
 
 A Pictorial Guide to Fossils by Gerard Ramon Case

Ammonitida genera
Nostoceratidae
Late Cretaceous ammonites of Europe
Ammonites of Africa
Ammonites of Australia
Late Cretaceous ammonites of North America
Campanian genus first appearances
Maastrichtian genus extinctions